Aerosucre Flight 157 was a domestic cargo flight from Germán Olano Airport in Puerto Carreño, Colombia, to El Dorado International Airport, Bogotá. On 20 December 2016, the Boeing 727-2J0F operating the route overran the runway during takeoff, striking the perimeter fence and other obstacles before becoming airborne, ultimately losing control and crashing  from the airport. Of the six people on board, only one survived, with severe injuries.

The subsequent investigation found that a number of factors, including a take-off weight in excess of the maximum permissible, an incorrect take-off technique, and a slight tailwind resulted in the failure of the aircraft to become airborne within the available runway length.

Accident

The Boeing 727 arrived at Puerto Carreño on the day of the accident at 14:48 local time, after a cargo flight from Bogotá. The crew unloaded  of cargo. The 727 then taxied onto Runway 25 threshold; the crew set the flaps at 30°, the plane was trimmed for takeoff, and the plane started its takeoff run at 17:18.

The 727 used all of the  runway, but was still not airborne. It traveled another  over grass and struck a perimeter fence. It then crossed a road on the airport's perimeter, where numerous motorcyclists and pedestrians narrowly avoided being hit by the aircraft. After crossing the road, the 727 then collided with a shed, then a tree, before finally becoming airborne. Due to the impact, the right main landing gear detached from the aircraft, the inboard right flap was damaged, engine 3 lost power, and one hydraulic system was damaged and leaking. The accident was captured on video by some of the motorcyclists on the perimeter road the aircraft crossed.

Aircraft and crew

The aircraft involved in the crash was a Boeing 727-200 registered HK-4544 with serial number 21105. It entered service in 1975, operating as a passenger aircraft for Air Jamaica until 1997. It was then converted into a cargo aircraft. The aircraft began operating for Aerosucre in 2008.

The captain was 58-year-old Jaime Cantillo, who had been with Aerosucre since 1997 and was licensed to fly the Boeing 727 in 2005. He had logged 8,708 flight hours, including 6,822 hours on the Boeing 727. The first officer was 39-year-old Mauricio Guzmán, who had been with the airline since 2008 and had 3,285 flight hours, all of which were on the Boeing 727. The flight engineer was 72-year-old Pedro Duarte, who joined Aerosucre in 2013 and had logged 1,612 flight hours, though his flight experience on the Boeing 727 was unknown.

Victims
The flight plan indicated five people aboard, but an undocumented sixth person was on the flight. Four died immediately and two survived the impact, but one of the survivors died later from injuries. The sole survivor was flight technician Diego Armando Vargas Bravo.

Investigation
 The crew incorrectly calculated a rotation speed that was  higher than necessary.
 The chosen take-off runway was subject to a  tail wind.
 The pilot rotated the aircraft too slowly, at about 1°/sec instead of 2 to 3°/sec.

The investigation also determined that following the loss of pressure in both main hydraulic systems caused by the impact with ground structures, the crew did not activate the standby hydraulic system, which would have enabled them to maintain control of the aircraft.

The operator Aerosucre was found in breach of regulations, since Puerto Carreño airport was not approved for operations with the Boeing 727-200, and such breach was allowed to continue for years due to lack of supervision by the Colombian civil aviation authority.

References

External links
 
Air Accident Investigation Group (GRIAA)
Preliminary report 
Final report 

2016 in Colombia
Accidents and incidents involving the Boeing 727
Aviation accidents and incidents in 2016
Aviation accidents and incidents in Colombia
December 2016 events in South America